Songs is an album by Deptford Goth.

Track listing

References

2014 albums